Dick Hutchinson (17 February 1890 – 1 June 1977) was an  Australian rules footballer who played with South Melbourne in the Victorian Football League (VFL).

Notes

External links 

1890 births
1977 deaths
Australian rules footballers from Victoria (Australia)
Sydney Swans players